Eyerly is a surname. Notable people with the surname include: 

Jeannette Eyerly (1908–2008), American writer of young adult fiction
Lee Eyerly (1892–1963), American civil aviation pioneer and amusement ride manufacturer
Eyerly Aircraft Company, company in Salem, Oregon, US

See also
Eberly